Shiroli is a village and industrial estate in Kolhapur district in the state of Maharashtra, India.

References

Villages in Kolhapur district